= Epping Forest Maryland =

Epping Forest, Maryland is a private community located near Annapolis, Maryland, established by Dr. Arthur Drevar in 1874.
